The Bitch Who Stole Christmas is a 2021 Christmas comedy film featuring RuPaul and twenty RuPaul's Drag Race contestants, among other celebrities. The film, which aired on VH1 on December 2, 2021, is produced by MTV Entertainment Studios and World of Wonder. It was directed by Don Scardino and written by Connor Wright and Christina Friel.

Plot
The film's official description reads: "In the draggiest Christmas movie ever made, a workaholic big-city fashion journalist is sent to a Christmas-obsessed small town to dig up a story when she finds herself in the middle of cut-throat housewives, a high-stakes "winter ball" competition, and a sinister plot that could destroy Christmas fore-evah!"

Cast

 Krysta Rodriguez as Olivia St. LaPelle
 Andy Ridings as Big Russ
 Anna Maria Horsford as Mayor Coont
 RuPaul as Hannah Contour
 Michelle Visage as the Narrator/Herself
 Peppermint as Bea Eeep
 Brooke Lynn Hytes as Kitty Myua
 Ginger Minj as Hazel Delashes
 Jan Sport as Jane McBeige
 Jaymes Mansfield as Delia Von Whitewoman
 Porkchop as Bertram
 Latrice Royale as The Spirit of Christmas
 Carson Kressley as Kreston Carsley
 Ross Mathews as Matt Rothews
 David Koechner as Mr. E
 Kim Petras as Herself
 Charo as Herself
 Morgan McMichaels as Lanette
 Tia Shipman as Young 1997 Hannah Contour
 Emilene Bell as Young Olivia St. LaPelle
 Heidi N Closet as Gorge Intern
 Gottmik as Tristian
 Raven as Shopping Lady
 Ian Delaney as Father
 Manila Luzon as Mother
 Mayhem Miller as Bus Driver
 Nadya Ginsburg as Barbara Walters' voice
 Laganja Estranja as Herself
 Rock M. Sakura as Toymaker
 Kelly Mantle as Madelyn/Wistful Woman
 Sutton Schultz as Little Lenny
 Chad Michaels as Cher
 Kylie Sonique Love as Dolly Parton
 Meiyee Apple Tam as Annoying Smart Girl
 Paul Kreppel as Cranky Old Man
 Joyce Greenleaf as Grandma
 Jackson Owens as Grandson
 Zack Cosby as Romantic Guy
 Samantha Perez as Hazel Stunt Double
 Nikkilette Wright as Mayor Stunt Double
 Nick Braga as Dancing Husband #1
 Montay Romero as Dancing Husband #2
 Brandon Mathis as Dancing Husband #3
 Mackenzie Green as Dancing Husband #4
 Grant Gilmore as Dancing Husband #5
 Ezra Sosa as Dancing Husband #6
 Kimora Blac as Townsfolk #1
 Nicola Graham as Townsfolk #2
 Pandora Boxx as Townsfolk #3
 Dominique Nicole Generaux as Townsfolk #4
 Bryan Carman as Townsfolk #5

See also
 List of Christmas films

References

External links

 

2020s American films
2020s Christmas comedy films
2020s English-language films
2021 comedy films
2021 films
2021 LGBT-related films
2021 television films
American Christmas comedy films
American comedy television films
American LGBT-related television films
Christmas television films
Cross-dressing in American films
Drag (clothing)-related films
Films directed by Don Scardino
LGBT-related comedy films
RuPaul's Drag Race
VH1 films
World of Wonder (company) films